Tarek Thabet (born 16 August 1971), also known as Tariq Thabit, is a Tunisian former professional footballer who played as a defender. At club level, he played for Espérance de Tunis for his entire career. He was a member of the Tunisian national team during the World Cups in 1998 and 2002.

He managed Libyan Premier League club Khaleej Sirte, after spending the 2008–09 season at Wefaq Sabratha. Thabet also coached Libyan club Al-Ahly SC (Benghazi) as well as numerous Tunisian clubs.

International goals

References

External links

1971 births
Living people
Tunisian footballers
Tunisia international footballers
Association football defenders
1998 FIFA World Cup players
2002 FIFA World Cup players
1994 African Cup of Nations players
1998 African Cup of Nations players
2000 African Cup of Nations players
Tunisian Ligue Professionnelle 1 players
Espérance Sportive de Tunis players
Tunisian football managers
AS Gabès managers
Stade Gabèsien managers
Jendouba Sport managers
ES Zarzis managers
Espérance Sportive de Tunis managers
EO Sidi Bouzid managers
AS Kasserine managers
AS Marsa managers
Salam Zgharta FC managers
US Ben Guerdane managers
Al-Hilal SC (Benghazi) managers
Tunisian expatriate football managers
Expatriate football managers in Libya
Tunisian expatriate sportspeople in Libya
Expatriate football managers in Lebanon
Tunisian expatriate sportspeople in Lebanon
Lebanese Premier League managers